Amon-Ra Julian Heru J. St. Brown (born October 24, 1999) is an American football wide receiver for the Detroit Lions of the National Football League (NFL). He played college football at USC and was drafted by the Lions in the fourth round of the 2021 NFL Draft. St. Brown tied NFL records of scoring touchdowns in 6 consecutive games aged 22-or-younger with Randy Moss and Rob Gronkowski, and recording 8+ receptions in 8 consecutive games with Antonio Brown and Michael Thomas, while also becoming the first player in NFL history to record 8+ receptions and a touchdown in 6 consecutive games, on September 18, 2022, against the Washington Commanders.

Early years
St. Brown was named after Amun, the supreme deity in the Egyptian religion, due to his father's interest in black consciousness and African heritage. St. Brown attended Servite High School in Anaheim, California as a freshman before transferring to Mater Dei High School in Santa Ana, California. As a senior in 2017, he had 72 receptions for 1,320 yards and 20 touchdowns. A five-star recruit ranked second among receiver prospects, St. Brown committed to the University of Southern California (USC) to play college football. He played with future USC teammate JT Daniels at Mater Dei.

College career

In his first game of his college career, St. Brown had seven receptions for 98 yards and a touchdown in a win over UNLV. On September 15, 2018, St. Brown finished with a career-high 167 yards receiving in a game against Texas. St. Brown finished his freshman season with 60 catches, 750 yards, and three touchdowns.

On November 9, 2019, he would record a career high 173 yards in a victory over Arizona State. As a sophomore in 2019, he finished with 77 receptions for 1,042 receiving yards and six receiving touchdowns, adding seven rushes for 60 yards and another touchdown.

As a junior in 2020, he finished with 41 receptions for 478 receiving yards and seven touchdowns in six games.

College statistics

Professional career
On January 2, 2021, St. Brown announced on his Instagram account that he would be declaring for the 2021 NFL Draft, and was projected by CBS Sports as a late first round pick.
After St. Brown worked out at the NFL Combine, the NFL released its report on St. Brown by senior NFL analyst Lance Zierlein. The report placed St. Brown at a 2nd to 3rd round projection, and predicted he would be an average starter. Other scouting reports including ones by Pro Football Focus and The Draft Network placed St. Brown anywhere from a third to fourth round selection, with emphasis on him being a second string receiver.

St. Brown was drafted in the fourth round, 112th overall, by the Detroit Lions in the 2021 NFL Draft. He signed his four-year rookie contract with Detroit on June 17, 2021.

Detroit Lions

2021 season

St. Brown played his first game in Week 1 against the San Francisco 49ers, recording his first reception and finishing the game with 2 receptions for 23 yards. He started his first game during Week 5 against the Minnesota Vikings. He recorded 7 receptions for 65 yards in the 17–19 loss. He recorded his first scoring play in a 2-point conversion attempt in the Week 6 11–34 loss against the Cincinnati Bengals.

The Lions entered the Week 13 matchup against the Minnesota Vikings 0–10–1, with a 364-day, 15 game winless streak. With 0:04 left in the 4th quarter down 23–27, quarterback Jared Goff threw the game-winning touchdown pass to St. Brown, his first career receiving touchdown and clinched the Lions' first win. At the conclusion of the December month, St. Brown won the NFL Offensive Rookie of the Month award. Over the month, he recorded 35 receptions, 340 receiving yards, and 3 receiving touchdowns, all of which led all rookies. He also recorded 26 rushing yards.

Overall, St. Brown finished his rookie season with 90 receptions for 912 receiving yards and 5 receiving touchdowns to go along with 61 rushing yards and 1 rushing touchdown. St. Brown finished fifth in yards for the 2021 wide receiver rookie class, with the most yards for a non-first round pick.

2022 season

Playing limited snaps, St. Brown put up 63 yards in 5 receptions across the entire preseason.

In the season opener against the Philadelphia Eagles, St. Brown put up an 8 reception, 64 yard performance with one receiving touchdown.
In Week 2 against the Washington Commanders, St. Brown became the first player in NFL history to have six straight regular season games with at least eight receptions and at least one touchdown, recording nine receptions for 116 yards and two touchdowns. The streak began in Week 15 of the 2021 season. St. Brown was named NFC Offensive Player of the Week as a result of his performance. In a rival Week 3 matchup against the Minnesota Vikings, that streak would end when St. Brown received 6 passes for 73 yards and no touchdowns. In the second quarter of that game, St. Brown would visit training staff with an ankle injury. This injury would cause St. Brown to miss the Week 4 matchup against the Seattle Seahawks where the Lions would lose in a close 45–48 shootout. Returning in Week 5 against the New England Patriots, St. Brown put up just 18 yards in 4 receptions in the 0–29 shutout.

With the Lions' returning from their bye week against the Dallas Cowboys, St. Brown went down into concussion protocol after being tackled by cornerback Jourdan Lewis following his first reception of the game. St. Brown would not return. St. Brown returned in Week 9 versus the Miami Dolphins. St. Brown put up 69 yards on 7 receptions in the 27–31 loss. In a Week 15 matchup visiting the Carolina Panthers, St. Brown topped 1,000 receiving yards for the 2022 season, becoming the youngest receiver in Lions' franchise history to accumulate 1,000 receiving yards in a single season, beating out Calvin Johnson's record by eight days.

NFL career statistics

Awards and records

NFL awards
 NFC Offensive Player of the Week – 2022 (Week 2)

Lions franchise records
 All-time Rookie receiving yards: 912
 Youngest player with 1,000 yard receiving season: 23 years 61 days

Personal life
St. Brown's mother, Miriam Brown née Steyer, is from Leverkusen, Germany. His father, John Brown, was a bodybuilder in the 1980s and a two-time amateur Mr. Universe. His brother, Equanimeous currently plays for the Chicago Bears in the National Football League (NFL), while another brother, Osiris, played college football at Stanford. St. Brown is also a community ambassador for Unite Health Share Ministries, a Christian healthcare non-profit organization. In addition to English, St. Brown also speaks fluent German and French.
His father chose his children's names from an interest in African names, particularly Egyptian ones.

References

External links
 
 Amon-Ra St. Brown on ESPN
 Amon-Ra St. Brown - Pro-football Reference
 USC Trojans bio

1999 births
Living people
American people of German descent
American football wide receivers
Detroit Lions players
People from Anaheim Hills, California
Players of American football from California
Sportspeople from Orange County, California
USC Trojans football players
National Conference Pro Bowl players